T3 (stylized as T3; pronounced "T-three", "T-cubed", or "Terror to the third power") is an inverted roller coaster at Kentucky Kingdom in Louisville, Kentucky. Previously named T2, the Suspended Looping Coaster model manufactured by Vekoma opened on April 8, 1995. The amusement park closed in 2009 due to financial difficulties, but later reopened under new ownership in 2014. The roller coaster was refurbished and renamed T3, which reopened to the public on July 3, 2015.

History
The concept to add inversions to the inverted roller coaster was first developed by Jim Wintrode, general manager of Six Flags Great America, in the 1990s. Wintrode worked with Walter Bolliger and Claude Mabillard – from Swiss roller coaster manufacturer Bolliger & Mabillard – along with engineer Robert Mampe to develop Batman: The Ride which opened at Six Flags Great America in 1992. Dutch amusement ride manufacturer Vekoma developed a similar concept shortly after, and the model became known as the Suspended Looping Coaster (SLC). Their first installation was El Condor at Walibi Holland which debuted in 1994.

In 1995, nine parks around the world announced plans to add Vekoma SLCs, including Kentucky Kingdom. On December 1, 1994, Kentucky Kingdom announced that they would be adding a Vekoma SLC named T2. This one was identical to the original prototype at Walibi Holland, but it featured a different color scheme – red track with purple trains. T2 would officially open on April 8, 1995.

At the end of 1997, the rights to operate Kentucky Kingdom were sold to Premier Parks for $64 million. Following the acquisition, Batman and DC Comics themes were added to Kentucky Kingdom. As a result, T2 was painted black for the 1999 season. This was due to a plan by Six Flags to retheme part of the park as Gotham City, and rebrand T2 as Batman: The Ride and its next door roller coaster, Chang, as Riddler's Revenge. However, these plans never came to fruition, while T2 retained its new coat of black paint.

Amid a corporate bankruptcy on February 4, 2010, Six Flags announced the park would cease operations immediately due to the rejection of an amended lease by the Kentucky State Fair Board. Under the efforts of former Kentucky Kingdom operator Ed Hart and several investors, the Kentucky Kingdom Redevelopment Company was formed to redevelop the park and reopen it. The Koch Family, owners of Holiday World & Splashin' Safari in Santa Claus, Indiana, also expressed interest in redeveloping the park. On February 23, 2012, the Kentucky Fair Board approved a lease agreement which would see the park reopen as Bluegrass Boardwalk. The plans called for the removal of T2 along with the Twisted Twins, due to age and safety concerns. However, plans soon unraveled, and the Koch family eventually withdrew from the investment.

On June 27, 2013, Ed Hart's investment group negotiated an agreement to spend $36 million to reopen the park under its former name Kentucky Kingdom in 2014. Plans involved a major refurbishment of T2 with a timeline to reopen the ride in 2015. Later it was revealed that its name would be changed to T3. The refurbished ride reopened on July 3, 2015, and featured renovated trains and track to provide a more comfortable experience for riders.

Characteristics

The ride is a clone of the first Vekoma SLC (El Condor at Walibi Holland).

T3 originally featured three trains. Each of these trains would seat 20 riders in ten rows of two. Despite this, the ride only ever operated with two trains at any one time, with the third train stored in the maintenance bay. This gave the ride a theoretical hourly capacity of 900 riders per hour. All of the trains were later shorted from ten rows down to seven rows, reducing each trains capacity to 14 riders. The third train was later removed from the ride with its ultimate fate unknown.

Ride experience
Once the train is loaded and secured, it departs the station directly onto the  chain lift hill. Once at the top, the train goes down a steep, banked turn to the right where it enters the first inversion element, a roll over. A roll over (also known as a Sea serpent roll) inverts riders twice by featuring a half loop followed by a twist, then another twist and a half loop. Upon exit from this element, the train goes up a hill which features some banking at the top before descending and approaching the ride's next inversion, a sidewinder. A sidewinder is similar to an Immelmann loop however it features a half loop followed by a half corkscrew (rather than an inline twist). From the exit of this sidewinder, the train goes into a sharp helix before entering the ride's final two inversions in the form of a double inline twist. A banked curve to the right turns the train back around to face towards the station with a slight hill leading into the brake run.

Incident

On June 2, 2018, T3 had a minor accident as the second train bumped into the first train, which was waiting to enter the station for unloading. Five people were injured, with one being taken to the hospital. The coaster was closed for an investigation of the incident. The ride reopened two days later.

References

External links
 Kentucky Kingdom's official website
 

Kentucky Kingdom
Roller coasters in Kentucky
Roller coasters operated by Six Flags
2015 establishments in Kentucky